The 32nd Marines Brigade is the marine unit of Greece. The brigade is based at the port town of Volos in Thessaly, and its primary role is infantry and amphibious operations on the numerous islands off the Greek coast. Unlike other countries, the Greek Marines form part of the Army, while the landing craft and naval equipment are provided by the Hellenic Navy.

History 
The unit traces its ancestry to the 32nd Infantry Regiment, formed in Preveza in 1919, then belonging to the 8th Infantry Division. It took part in the Greco-Turkish War as part of the Kydoniai Division and the 5th Infantry Division, and later in the Greco-Italian War during the Second World War. After the occupation of Greece by the Germans, it was disbanded. In 1959 the Regiment was raised anew as the 132nd Light Infantry Regiment and moved to Attica as a reserve unit, but in 1967 was reorganized as a Marines unit under the name 32nd Marines Regiment.

In January 1988, after the disbandment of the unified 3rd Special Forces Division, the unit was enlarged to brigade size. It is currently placed under the II Army Corps as part of the Greek Rapid Reaction Force.

The 32nd Marines Brigade was established in 1988 after the reorganization of the Special Forces Command.

Uniform and Unit Insignia 

All Marines wear the standard-issue Greek Lizard camouflage BDUs of the Hellenic Army. Members of the 32nd Marines Brigade originally wore the blue beret, but this was changed to the green beret in 2001 because of its Special Forces role. The blue beret was, subsequently, issued to infantry units.

The unit insignia depicts the Argo, the ship of Jason and the Argonauts, and is representative of the first recorded Greek marine expedition. Brigade HQ is based at Volos, near the ancient Thessalian port city of Iolcos, from where the Argonauts embarked on their mission to retrieve the Golden Fleece. The unit flash is emblazoned with ΔΥΝΑΜΕΙΣ ΠΕΖΟΝΑΥΤΩΝ Dynamis Pezonavton (Marine Forces).

The unit motto is Courage Is Necessary ( - Tharsin Hri), attributed to the Goddess Athena, through the mouth of Odysseus, as words of encouragement to the Greek forces besieging the city of Troy.

Structure 
32nd Marines Brigade "Moravas" in Volos, Thessaly
 Headquarters Company 
 505th Marines Battalion-Training Center (
 Command company, three Marine companies, Support company
 521st Marines Battalion 
 Command company, three Marine companies, Support company
 575th Marines Battalion 
 Command company, three Marine companies, Support company
 32nd Medium Tank Squadron
 Four tank platoons, with a total of 17 Leopard 1A5 tanks
 32nd Field Artillery Battalion
 Command battery and three fire batteries, with a total of 12 Μ109 howitzers 
 32nd Marines Engineers Company 
 32nd Light Air Artillery Battery 
 32nd Signals Company
 32nd Support Battalion

References and external links 

Infantry brigades of Greece
Special forces of Greece
Greece
1919 establishments in Greece
Military units and formations established in 1919